The 2022 Washington Open (called the Citi Open for sponsorship reasons) was a tennis tournament played on outdoor hard courts. It was the 53rd edition of the Washington Open for the men. It was the 10th edition of the tournament for the women and the first since 2019. The event was part of the ATP Tour 500 series of the 2022 ATP Tour, WTA 250 of the 2022 WTA Tour and part of the US Open Series leading up to the US Open grand slam in September. The Washington Open took place at the William H.G. FitzGerald Tennis Center in Washington, D.C., United States, from August 1 to August 7, 2022.

Champions

Men's singles 

  Nick Kyrgios def.  Yoshihito Nishioka, 6–4, 6–3

Men's doubles 

  Nick Kyrgios /  Jack Sock def.  Ivan Dodig /  Austin Krajicek, 7–5, 6–4

Women's singles 

  Liudmila Samsonova def.  Kaia Kanepi, 4–6, 6–3, 6–3

This was Samsonova's second WTA Tour title, and first of the year.

Women's doubles 

  Jessica Pegula /  Erin Routliffe def.  Anna Kalinskaya /  Caty McNally, 6–3, 5–7, [12–10]

Points and Prize Money

Point distribution

Prize money

*per team

ATP Singles main draw entrants

Seeds 

† Rankings are as of July 25, 2022.

Other entrants 
The following players received wildcard entry into the singles main draw :
  Christopher Eubanks 
  Bradley Klahn
  Stefan Kozlov
  J. J. Wolf

The following player received entry with a protected ranking:
  Kyle Edmund

The following players received entry from the qualifying draw:
  Taro Daniel
  Borna Gojo
  Dominik Koepfer 
  Michael Mmoh
  Yosuke Watanuki
  Wu Tung-lin

Withdrawals 
 Before the tournament
  Alexander Bublik → replaced by  Peter Gojowczyk
  Francisco Cerúndolo → replaced by  Jack Draper

ATP Doubles main draw entrants

Seeds 

† Rankings are as of July 25, 2022.

Other entrants 
The following pairs received wildcard entry into the doubles main draw :
  Alex de Minaur /  Frances Tiafoe
  Denis Kudla /  Denis Shapovalov

The following pair received entry from the qualifying draw:
  Emil Ruusuvuori /  Luke Saville

Withdrawals 
Before the tournament
  Marcel Granollers /  Horacio Zeballos → replaced by  Nick Kyrgios /  Jack Sock
  Nikola Mektić /  Rajeev Ram → replaced by  Rajeev Ram /  Horacio Zeballos 
  Rafael Matos /  David Vega Hernández → replaced by  Mackenzie McDonald /  Botic van de Zandschulp

WTA Singles main draw entrants

Seeds 

† Rankings are as of July 25, 2022.

Other entrants 
The following players received wildcard entry into the main draw :
  Hailey Baptiste
  Sofia Kenin
  Venus Williams

The following players received entry from the qualifying draw:
  Mirjam Björklund 
  Cristina Bucșa
  Louisa Chirico
  Rebecca Marino

The following player received entry as a lucky loser:
  Wang Xiyu

Withdrawals 
 Before the tournament
  Marie Bouzková → replaced by  Wang Xiyu
  Leylah Fernandez → replaced by  Harriet Dart
  Ann Li → replaced by  Greet Minnen
  Anastasia Potapova → replaced by  Daria Saville

WTA Doubles main draw entrants

Seeds 

† Rankings are as of July 25, 2022.

Other entrants 
The following pairs received wildcard entry into the doubles main draw :
  Makenna Jones /  Sloane Stephens
  Jamie Loeb /  Christina McHale

Withdrawals 
  Sophie Chang /  Angela Kulikov → replaced by  Sophie Chang /  Astra Sharma
  Lucie Hradecká /  Sania Mirza → replaced by  Lucie Hradecká /  Monica Niculescu
  Anastasia Potapova /  Yana Sizikova → replaced by  Allura Zamarripa /  Maribella Zamarripa
  Alicja Rosolska /  Erin Routliffe → replaced by  Jessica Pegula /  Erin Routliffe

References

External links 
Official website

2022
2022 ATP Tour
2022 WTA Tour
2022 in American tennis
August 2022 sports events in the United States